Phyllanthus cauliflorus is a species of plant in the family Phyllanthaceae. It is endemic to Jamaica.

References

cauliflorus
Vulnerable plants
Endemic flora of Jamaica
Taxonomy articles created by Polbot